The men's discus throw event at the 1999 European Athletics U23 Championships was held in Göteborg, Sweden, at Ullevi on 31 July and 1 August 1999.

Medalists

Results

Final
1 August

Qualifications
31 July
Qualifying perf. 58.00 or 12 best to the Final

Group A

Group B

Participation
According to an unofficial count, 21 athletes from 13 countries participated in the event.

 (1)
 (1)
 (1)
 (2)
 (2)
 (2)
 (2)
 (2)
 (1)
 (3)
 (1)
 (2)
 (1)

References

Discus throw
Discus throw at the European Athletics U23 Championships